Doris Lo (Pinyin: Lú Sùjuān; 20 July 1952 – 22 July 2006) was a Hong Kong voice actor who was best known for voicing the character Nobita Nobi for the Hong Kong version of the anime along with Lam Pou-chuen who voices the character Doraemon.

Lo died at the age of 54 from colorectal cancer at Shatin Hospital in Hong Kong.

References

1952 births
2006 deaths
Doraemon
Deaths from cancer in Hong Kong
Deaths from colorectal cancer
Hong Kong voice actresses